Płock is a Polish parliamentary constituency in the Masovian Voivodeship.  It elects twelve members of the Sejm.

The district has the number '16' for elections to the Sejm and is named after the city of Płock.  It includes the counties of Ciechanów, Gostynin, Mława, Płock, Płońsk, Przasnysz, Sierpc, Sochaczew, Żuromin, and Żyrardów, and the city county of Płock.

List of members

2019-2023

Footnotes

Electoral districts of Poland
Masovian Voivodeship
Płock